The Disaster Artist is a 2017 American biographical comedy-drama film starring, co-produced and  directed by James Franco. It was written by Scott Neustadter and Michael H. Weber, based on Greg Sestero and Tom Bissell's 2013 non-fiction book of the same title. The film chronicles an unlikely friendship between aspiring actors Tommy Wiseau and Sestero that results in the production of Wiseau's 2003 film The Room, widely considered one of the worst films ever made. The Disaster Artist stars brothers James and Dave Franco as Wiseau and Sestero, respectively, alongside a supporting cast featuring Alison Brie, Ari Graynor, Josh Hutcherson, Jacki Weaver, and Seth Rogen.

Principal photography began on December 8, 2015. A work-in-progress cut of the film premiered at South by Southwest on March 12, 2017; it was later screened at the 2017 Toronto International Film Festival on September 11, and also played at the 2017 San Sebastián International Film Festival, where it became the first American film to win its top prize, the Golden Shell, since A Thousand Years of Good Prayers in 2007.

Distributed by A24 in North America and Warner Bros. Pictures internationally, The Disaster Artist began a limited release on December 1, 2017, before opening wide on December 8, 2017. It received positive reviews from critics, with the chemistry of the Francos and their portrayals of Wiseau and Sestero, as well as the film's humor and screenplay, receiving praise, and was chosen by the National Board of Review as one of the top ten films of 2017. At the 75th Golden Globe Awards, James Franco won the award for Best Actor – Musical or Comedy; the film was also nominated for Best Motion Picture – Musical or Comedy. Franco also received a nomination for Outstanding Performance by a Male Actor in a Leading Role at the 24th Screen Actors Guild Awards, and the film earned a nomination for Best Adapted Screenplay at the 90th Academy Awards.

Plot
In San Francisco in 1998, 19-year-old Greg Sestero befriends Tommy Wiseau in Jean Shelton's acting class after Tommy gives a protracted and bizarre interpretation of a scene from A Streetcar Named Desire. Greg is impressed by Tommy's fearlessness, though Tommy also exhibits unusual habits and mannerisms; for instance, he can afford apartments in both San Francisco and Los Angeles, but he will not discuss his personal life or the source of his wealth. Tommy also insists he is from New Orleans, despite his pronounced European accent. At Tommy's suggestion, the two move to Los Angeles to pursue acting careers.

Greg signs with talent agent Iris Burton and regularly attends auditions. At the same time, Tommy is consistently rejected by agencies, acting teachers, casting directors, and producers. He also seems to think that Amber, Greg's new girlfriend, is sabotaging his friendship with Greg. When Greg's auditions begin to dry up because of his lack of talent, he shares his frustrations with Tommy, who decides to make a film for them to star in. Tommy writes the screenplay for The Room, a melodrama about a love triangle between banker Johnny (played by Tommy), his fiancée Lisa, and his best friend Mark (played by Greg, who is also given a line producer credit). They rent production space from Birns & Sawyer, from whom Tommy insists on buying, rather than renting, all of the production equipment he will need. He also decides to shoot the film on 35 mm film and HD Digital simultaneously, which is another costly and unnecessary measure. The production house employees introduce Tommy to Raphael Smadja and Sandy Schklair, who are hired as cinematographer and script supervisor, respectively. Actress Juliette Danielle is cast as Lisa.

Production starts relatively smoothly, but Tommy's controlling behavior and inexperience cause the situation to deteriorate. He forgets his lines, arrives late, and refuses to supply his crew with basic needs, such as drinking water and air conditioning. No one receives a full script, and the cast and crew are baffled by the film's nonsensical plot and Tommy's inexplicable directorial and acting choices. During preparation for a sex scene, which is being filmed shortly after Greg has told Tommy that he is moving in with Amber, Tommy refuses to film on a closed set, doesn't put on a robe between scenes, and humiliates Juliette by pointing out the acne on her shoulder to the entire crew. When confronted about this, Tommy responds by revealing that he regularly watches the extensive behind-the-scenes footage of the production, so he knows what the cast and crew members have been saying about him behind his back, and he accuses everyone, including Greg, of not supporting his vision.

While The Room is still filming, Greg and Amber run into Bryan Cranston, who is in the same Pilates class as Amber, at a cafe. He says he is directing an upcoming episode of the TV show he is on, Malcolm in the Middle, and invites Greg to play a lumberjack, mainly because Greg has a beard. Greg is scheduled to shave his beard soon for The Room, so he begs Tommy to delay shooting those scenes, but Tommy refuses. Greg reluctantly chooses to finish the film and give up the opportunity to be on Malcolm. On the last day of shooting, which is on location back in San Francisco, a frustrated Greg accuses Tommy of selfishness and duplicity throughout their friendship and questions his actual age and origins. The two fight, and Greg storms off.

By June 2003, Amber and Greg have split up, and Greg has started working in theatre. Tommy has finished work on The Room in the eight months since their falling out, and he invites Greg to the premiere. Greg initially is reluctant, but Tommy convinces him to come and, to his surprise, the entire cast and crew also attend. The capacity audience reacts with bemused silence and then, increasingly, with laughter to Tommy's poor performance, script, and film making techniques. A devastated Tommy storms out of the theater, but Greg brings him back and points out that the audience's enthusiastic response is something to be proud of while reconciling their friendship. With renewed optimism, Tommy takes the stage as The Room ends and expresses his appreciation of the warm reception for his "comedic" film. He invites Greg to join him, and the pair receive a standing ovation.

In a post-credits scene, Tommy meets Henry, a partygoer (played by the actual Tommy Wiseau) who asks Tommy if he wants to hang out. He refuses, though he does recognize Henry's familiar "New Orleans" accent.

Cast

Kristen Bell, Ike Barinholtz, Adam Scott, Kevin Smith, Keegan-Michael Key, Lizzy Caplan, Danny McBride and J. J. Abrams appear as themselves in a prologue discussing The Room and its reputation. Other roles include John Early as Burton's executive assistant Chris Snyder, Joe Mande as DP Todd Barron, Charlyne Yi as costume designer Safowa Bright-Asare, Kelly Oxford as makeup artist Amy Von Brock, Tom Franco as Karl, Zoey Deutch as Tommy's acting classmate Bobbi, Sugar Lyn Beard as an actress auditioning for Lisa, Brian Huskey as a bank teller, Randall Park as Greg's acting classmate Rob, Jerrod Carmichael as an actor friend of Greg's, Casey Wilson as a casting director, Lauren Ash as the florist in The Rooms "Hi, doggie" sequence, and Angelyne as herself. Bryan Cranston makes an uncredited cameo appearance as himself. Greg Sestero appears as an assistant casting director, while Tommy Wiseau appears in a post-credits scene as a character named Henry.

Production

Development
In February 2014, Seth Rogen's production company Point Grey Pictures announced it had acquired the book and film rights to The Disaster Artist. James Franco was set to direct and play Wiseau, and his brother Dave Franco was cast as Sestero. James Franco stated The Disaster Artist was "a combination of Boogie Nights and The Master". According to Franco, Wiseau initially had hoped Johnny Depp would play him. In April 2016, the title was reported to have changed from The Disaster Artist to The Masterpiece, though The Disaster Artist was confirmed as the official title when the film's SXSW premiere was announced.

Casting
In June 2014, James Franco's younger brother, Dave Franco, informally announced at a midnight showing of The Room that he had been cast in the co-starring role of Greg Sestero. Wiseau praised the decision in a Q&A session. The film is the first collaboration of James and brother Dave, as the younger Franco has said that he had sought different projects deliberately, specifying in an interview at the Toronto International Film Festival, "I didn't want people to think I was riding his coattails." As New Line Cinema sought to acquire The Disaster Artist in October 2015, one of the film's producers, and frequent Franco collaborator, Seth Rogen, was in negotiations to play The Rooms script supervisor, Sandy Schklair. The remainder of the principal cast were revealed in the days prior to the beginning of filming, in early December 2015: Josh Hutcherson as Philip Haldiman, Ari Graynor as Juliette Danielle, Jacki Weaver as Carolyn Minnott, Hannibal Buress as Bill Meur, Andrew Santino as Scott Holmes, and Zac Efron as Dan Janjigian. Dave Franco's wife, Alison Brie, joined the cast in the role of Sestero's then-girlfriend, Amber, and Sharon Stone was later announced to have been cast as Hollywood talent agent Iris Burton. Sestero stated in January 2016 that Bryan Cranston had been cast in the film in an undisclosed role. In November 2016, he was revealed to be playing himself during his time working on Malcolm in the Middle.

Filming
Principal photography began on December 8, 2015, in Los Angeles, and ended on January 28, 2016. Among the locations used was The Ojai Apartments on Whitley Terrace in Hollywood. Dave Porter composed the film's score.

Release
The film had its premiere, in a work-in-progress form, at South by Southwest on March 12, 2017. In May 2017, A24 acquired distribution rights to the film, and set the film for a limited release on December 1, 2017, before a wide release on December 8. Warner Bros. Pictures distributes the film internationally, and it received an IMAX release in selected areas as well. On October 25, 2017, A24 mounted a billboard on Highland Avenue in Los Angeles that replicated the original The Room billboard that Wiseau kept up from 2003 to 2008.

The film was released on Blu-ray, DVD and digital download on March 13, 2018. As of February 20, 2019, its estimated US home media sales were $1,288,213.

Reception

Box office
The Disaster Artist grossed $21.1 million in the United States and Canada and $8.7 million in other territories for a worldwide total of $29.8 million, against a production budget of $10 million.

The film grossed $1.2 million from 19 theaters in its limited opening weekend, finishing 12th at the box office and averaging $64,254 per venue, one of the highest averages of 2017. The film had its wide expansion the following week, alongside the opening of Just Getting Started and I, Tonya and was projected to gross around $5 million from 840 theaters over the weekend. It ended up making $6.4 million, finishing 4th at the box office. The following week, despite being added to 170 additional theaters, the film dropped a more-than-expected 57% to $2.7 million, finishing 8th. In its third weekend of wide release it made $884,576 ($1.2 million over the four day Christmas frame), dropping to 17th.

Critical response
The Disaster Artist received a standing ovation at its initial screening at South by Southwest. The site's critical consensus reads, "Oh, hai Mark. The Disaster Artist is a surprisingly poignant and charming movie-about-a-movie that explores the creative process with unexpected delicacy." Metacritic, which uses a weighted average, assigned The Disaster Artist a score of 76 out of 100 based on 44 critics, indicating "generally favorable reviews". Audiences polled by PostTrak gave the film an 81% overall positive score and a 66% "definite recommend".

Erik Childress of The Playlist dubbed James Franco's performance his "best... since his Oscar-nominated turn in 127 Hours." Further, he wrote that "as a director it is nice to finally see him embrace the comfort zone of comedy with enough cameos to rival Robert Altman's The Player." Peter Debruge of Variety said it had a "genuine capacity to delight, whether or not the audiences in question have seen The Room."

Writing for Rolling Stone, Peter Travers gave the film 3.5 out of 4 stars, saying: "As a director, Franco succeeds beautifully at bringing coherence to chaos, a word that accurately describes the making of this modern midnight-movie phenomenon. Do you need to see The Room to appreciate The Disaster Artist? Not really." Justin Chang of the Los Angeles Times called the film "a hilarious, heartening celebration of failure".

Manohla Dargis of The New York Times wrote that it is "a divertingly funny movie, but its breeziness can also feel overstated, at times glib and a bit of a dodge". Peter Bradshaw of The Guardian gave the film three out of five stars, writing that it brings up unanswered questions, and "has room for improvement". Ignatiy Vishnevetsky of The A.V. Club gave the film a rating of "C", calling it a "lousy tribute" and asking, "will anyone who hasn't seen The Room actually be able to piece together a sense of this Z-grade sensation from watching The Disaster Artist?"

Accolades

Accuracy
Although based on a true story, the film dramatizes and omits several events:

 In the film Tommy gets the inspiration to write The Room simply as a feature film vehicle for him and Greg; in real life it started out as a play and Tommy was inspired after seeing The Talented Mr. Ripley.
 Greg's mother is a native French speaker and thus has a corresponding accent, which Greg used for his role in the horror movie Retro Puppet Master. Megan Mullally's portrayal of his mother does not have a distinct accent.
 While the turmoil on set is depicted in the film, the real-life production had a much higher turnover rate, going through three different sets of crew (opposed to just the two members fired in the film).
 At the time The Disaster Artist is set, Greg had never met Bryan Cranston in real life, and was not forced to choose between The Room and shooting an episode of Malcolm in the Middle. He was reluctant to shave his beard due to wanting to dissociate himself from The Room.
 While the film depicts the premiere of The Room being met with laughter and applause, the real initial screening was received poorly and many audience members walked out in the first five minutes; it took time for its cult status to develop.

Notes

References

External links

The Disaster Artist at History vs. Hollywood
Official Screenplay

2017 films
2010s biographical films
American biographical films
A24 (company) films
2017 independent films
Biographical films about film directors and producers
Films about filmmaking
Films about films
Films based on non-fiction books
Films directed by James Franco
Films with screenplays by Scott Neustadter and Michael H. Weber
Films set in 1998
Films set in 1999
Films set in 2001
Films set in 2002
Films set in 2003
Films set in the 1990s
Films set in the 2000s
Films set in Los Angeles
Films set in San Francisco
Films shot in Los Angeles
New Line Cinema films
Point Grey Pictures films
Warner Bros. films
Films featuring a Best Musical or Comedy Actor Golden Globe winning performance
Cultural depictions of film directors
Cultural depictions of Polish men
2017 comedy-drama films
Biographical films about actors
Films produced by Evan Goldberg
2010s English-language films
2010s American films